The National Defense Authorization Act for Fiscal Year 2022 (NDAA 2022, Pub.L. 117-81) is a United States federal law which specifies the budget, expenditures and policies of the U.S. Department of Defense (DOD) for fiscal year 2022. Analogous NDAAs have been passed annually for 60 years.

History
The House of Representatives bill  was introduced on July 2, 2021, by Rep. Adam Smith of Washington state, the chair of the House Armed Services Committee. Markup began on July 28. 780 amendments were made during markup, which ended on August 31. A corresponding Senate bill, was introduced on September 22.

The House approved their version of the bill in a 316 to 113 vote on September 23. It included a provision that women, like men, should be required to register for Selective Service. However, this was later removed from the final bill.

The Senate approved to move forward and consider the House's version of the NDAA instead of theirs on November 17, by a 84 to 15 vote. Conflict in the Senate led the version of the bill introduced in the Senate to be placed on hold, due to objections by Senator Marco Rubio over the attached amendment package. A compromise bill was created through a previously introduced Senate bill, S. 1605 on December 7, and the House passed it on the same day with bipartisan support, which removed some of the provisions in the Senate version of the NDAA bill. On December 15, the compromise bill was passed by the Senate in a 88–11 vote.

President Joe Biden signed the NDAA 2022 into law on December 27, 2021.

Provisions
 directs the Secretary and Director of National Intelligence to establish an office to carry out the duties of the Unidentified Aerial Phenomena Task Force (UAPTF). In July 2022 the All-domain Anomaly Resolution Office (AARO) was (re-)established to meet those requirements. This section was later amended by the 2023 NDAA.  was enacted as part of the later Intelligence Authorization Act for Fiscal Year 2022.

See also
 National Defense Authorization Act
 Military budget of the United States
2021 in United States politics and government

References

External links
 National Defense Authorization Act for Fiscal Year 2022 as amended (PDF/details) in the GPO Statute Compilations collection
 National Defense Authorization Act for Fiscal Year 2022 as enacted (PDF/details) in the US Statutes at Large

U.S. National Defense Authorization Acts
Acts of the 117th United States Congress
Government responses to UFOs